Salsola oppositifolia is a halophyte shrub native to the Mediterranean Basin.

Description 
This annual, woody plant can grow into shrubs up to 2 m tall. It has cylindrical-linear and opposed leaves. The flowers, which bloom from May to October, are hermphrodyte and have a size of 1 cm.

Taxonomy 
Salsola oppositifolia was first described by René Louiche Desfontaines and published in Flora Atlantica 1: 219. 1798.

Uses 
This plant has been historically used, along with other Salsola species, as a source of soda ash, in the manufacture of lye and soaps.

References

External links 

Amaranthaceae
Halophytes
Industrial history
Plants described in 1798
Barilla plants
Flora of Algeria
Flora of Spain
Flora of Tunisia